The BRW Rich 200, 2013 is the 30th annual survey of the wealthiest people resident in Australia, published in hardcopy and online formats in the BRW magazine on 24 May 2013. This was the last list published in hardcopy format by the BRW as the final hardcopy issue of the BRW was published in November 2013.

In the 2013 list, the net worth of the wealthiest individual, Gina Rinehart, was 22.02 billion. 

The BRW Rich Families List was published annually since 2008. In the 2013 list, the Smorgon family headed the list with estimated wealth of 2.64 billion. The Smorgon families headed the families list in every year of its publication. The families list was last published in 2015.

List of individuals 

{| class="wikitable"
!colspan="2"|Legend
|-
! Icon
! Description
|-
|
|Has not changed from the previous year's list
|-
|
|Has increased from the previous year's list
|-
|
|Has decreased from the previous year's list
|}

List of families

{| class="wikitable"
!colspan="2"|Legend
|-
! Icon
! Description
|-
|
|Has not changed from the previous year's list
|-
|
|Has increased from the previous year's list
|-
|
|Has decreased from the previous year's list
|}

See also
 Financial Review Rich List
 Forbes Asia list of Australians by net worth

References

External links 

2013 in Australia
2013